1Borneo Hypermall is a 23.3 acres wide shopping centre located along Jalan Sulaman Highway in Kota Kinabalu, Sabah, Malaysia. It's the largest shopping mall on Borneo Island.

Features

 Over 3,500 parking spaces
 32 electric elevators, 4 parallel elevators, 23 guest elevators and 10 freight elevators
 6 lifts for the disabled
 Multiple ATM machines
 Wifi wireless Internet access in the entire shopping plaza
 Modern 36-lane bowling alley, 8 theatres, KTV and a fitness center

See also
 List of shopping malls in Malaysia

References

External links
 

2008 establishments in Malaysia
Buildings and structures in Kota Kinabalu
Shopping malls in Sabah